James Allen Stimson (born December 12, 1943) is an American political scientist and the Raymond Dawson Distinguished Bicentennial Professor of Political Science Emeritus at the University of North Carolina at Chapel Hill. After teaching at the University at Buffalo and Florida State University, among other institutions, he joined the faculty of the University of North Carolina at Chapel Hill in 1997, remaining there until his retirement in 2018. A fellow of the American Academy of Arts and Sciences, he served as a fellow of the Center for Advanced Study in the Behavioral Sciences from 1994 to 1995 and as a Guggenheim Fellow from 2006 to 2007. He has received the Eulau and Kammerer Awards from the American Political Science Association, as well as the Chastain Award from the Southern Political Science Association. In 2016, he received the Warren J. Mitofsky Award for Excellence in Public Opinion Research from the Board of Directors of the Roper Center for Public Opinion Research.

References

External links

Living people
1943 births
American political scientists
Center for Advanced Study in the Behavioral Sciences fellows
Fellows of the American Academy of Arts and Sciences
University of North Carolina at Chapel Hill faculty
University of Minnesota alumni
University of North Carolina at Chapel Hill alumni
University at Buffalo faculty
Florida State University faculty